The Cape file snake (Limaformosa capensis) is a species of large, non-venomous snake endemic to Africa, belonging to the family Lamprophiidae.

Geographic range
L. capensis is found from Natal northwards through the former Transvaal and Zimbabwe, and westwards to the Caprivi Strip and Namibia, thence northwards to Cameroon and Somalia.

Description
L. capensis is a medium to large snake. It has a very flat head, and its body is strikingly triangular in cross-section.

The Cape file snake's dorsal scales are strongly keeled with extensive pink-purple bare skin between the scales. Its colour is mostly grey to grey-brown, but occasionally dark olive to purple-brown. The prominent vertebral stripe is white to yellow, while the belly is ivory white to cream.

The dorsal scales, in addition to the strong primary keel, have secondary keels and tubercles, but no apical pits. The dorsal scales are arranged in 15 rows at midbody (in 17 rows on the neck). The ventrals number 203-241. The anal plate is undivided. The subcaudals number 45-61, and are divided (in two rows).

Habitat

Diet
Though it is not venomous, the Cape file snake is a highly successful predator of other snakes, easily following a scent trail and apparently immune to all venom. It also preys on small vertebrates.

Defense
Rarely attempting to bite when captured, L. capensis may defecate in self-defence.

Reproduction
L. capensis is oviparous. In the summer, an adult female may lay one or two clutches of eggs. Clutch size varies from 5-13. The eggs are large, 47–55 mm (about 2 inches) long, by 20–31 mm (about 1 inch) wide. Each hatchling is 39–42 cm (about 16 inches) in total length (including tail).

References

Further reading
Broadley DG, Tolley KA, Conradie W, Wishart S, Trape J-F, Burger M, Kusamba C, Zassi-Boulou A-G, Greenbaum E (2018). "A phylogeny and genus-level revision of the African file snakes Gonionotophis Boulenger (Squamata: Lamprophiidae)". African Journal of Herpetology 67: 43–60. (Limaformosa capensis, new combination).
Smith A (1847). Illustrations of the Zoology of South Africa; Consisting Chiefly of Figures and Descriptions of the Objects of Natural History Collected during an Expedition into the Interior of South Africa, in the Years 1834, 1835, and 1836; Fitted Out by "The Cape of Good Hope Association for Exploring Central Africa:" together with a Summary of African Zoology, and an Inquiry into the Geographical Ranges of Species in that Quarter of the Globe. Volume III. Reptilia. Part 26. London: Lords Commissioners of Her Majesty's Treasury. (Smith, Elder and Co., printers). (Heterolepis capensis, Plate LV).

Colubrids
Snakes of Africa
Reptiles described in 1847